Nandamuri is an Indian surname.  People with the name include:

 Nandamuri Balakrishna (born 1960), an Indian film actor
 Nandamuri Harikrishna (1953–2018), an Indian actor and politician
 Nandamuri Kalyan Ram (born 1978), an Indian actor 
 Nandamuri Taraka Rama Rao (1923–1996), or NTR, an Indian actor and politician
 Nandamuri Taraka Rama Rao Jr. (born 1983), or Jr. NTR, an Indian actor
 Nandamuri Taraka Ratna (born 1983), an Indian actor

Indian surnames
Surnames of Indian origin